Matheson, New South Walesis  civil parish of Manara County and a rural locality of Central Darling Shire in far western New South Wales.

Matheson is located at 32°49′35″S 144°12′59″E and the area is hot and arid and as such there are no settlements with Matheson but the nearest town is Ivanhoe 3 kilometers to the south east.

References

Manara County